Sean Nicholas Savage (born London May 30th, 1986) is a Canadian Singer, Songwriter, and Musical Playwright. He has been described by Emilie Friedlander in an article for The Fader as "a singer-songwriter, madcap philosopher, and all-around scene-pillar in the particular freak-flag-flying sector of the Canadian music community. He is known for his prolific output, poetic lyrics and varied musical style.

Sean Nicholas Savage has released exclusively on Arbutus Records, and was one of the first artists to join the label after its inception in 2009. Savage has had a number of notable collaborations, including a production and vocal credit on Solange's number-one album on the Billboard 200 in the United States.

Musical Plays
Please Thrill Me Montreal, Canada, February 17th - March 1st (2020)
The Fear Berlin, Germany, August 24 (2022)
The Fear Los Angeles, USA, October 30 (2022)

Discography

Early Years
Summer 5000 (2008) CD
Spread Free Like A Butterfly (2009) Vinyl
Movin Up in Society (2010) Cassette
Mutual Feelings of Respect And Admiration (2010) Vinyl

Cassette Trilogy 1
Tripple Midnight Karma (2011) Cassette
Won Ton Jaz (2011) Cassette
Flamingo (2011) Cassette

Golden Era
Other Life (2013) Vinyl, CD
Bermuda Waterfall (2014) Vinyl, CD
Other Death (2015) Vinyl, CD

Cassette Trilogy 2
Magnificent Fist (2016) Cassette
Yummycoma (2017) Cassette
Screamo (2018) Cassette

Minimal Era
Life Is Crazy (2020) Vinyl, CD
Shine (2022) Vinyl

Collaborations 
In 2017, Savage was credited a featured artist on Kirin J. Callinan's song 'My Moment feat. Sean Nicholas Savage' from the 2017 album 'Bravado'.

Videos

References

External links
  Sean Nicholas Savage on Arbutus Records

1986 births
Musicians from Edmonton
Canadian singer-songwriters
Living people
Canadian indie pop musicians
21st-century Canadian male singers
Arbutus Records artists
Canadian male singer-songwriters